

A–Z

Documentaries

Short films

See also
 1939 in Germany

Bibliography 
 Klaus, Ulrich J. Deutsche Tonfilme: Jahrgang 1939. Klaus-Archiv, 1988.
 Rentschler, Eric. The Ministry of Illusion: Nazi Cinema and Its Afterlife. Harvard University Press, 1996.

External links 
IMDB listing for German films made in 1939
filmportal.de listing for films made in 1939

German
Lists of German films
film